Superbloom is the third studio album by American indie pop band MisterWives, released July 24, 2020 via Fueled by Ramen. The album did not chart on the Billboard 200, but it peaked at #78 on the Billboard Album Sales chart and #48 on the Current Album Sales chart. The title track has over 85 million streams on Spotify.

In a 2020 interview with Paper Magazine, MisterWives front woman Mandy Lee says the album "unfolds my journey of finding a superbloom within the barren desert and the needed juxtaposition of the two in order to grow" later elaborating that the desert refers to her eight year relationship with the drummer for the band, Etienne Bowler. The split was announced 2 months prior to the release of the album. The album clearly describes the journey Lee faced during her relationship and the journey she faced after. 

Superbloom was followed by the release of Mini Bloom, the prequel to the album. Mini Bloom included 5 songs off of the follow-up project. The songs included "Coming Up For Air", "Find My Way Home", "Stories", "Whywhywhy", and "The End". MisterWives debuted the collection of songs in 2019 on the first leg of The Bandito Tour, where they were the supporting act for headliners Twenty One Pilots.

On May 20, 2020, four singles were released ahead of Superblooms release: "Rock Bottom", "Superbloom", "Decide to Be Happy" and "3 Small Words".

Track listing

Chart positions

References

External links
 
 

2020 albums
Fueled by Ramen albums
MisterWives albums